Sphincterochila prophetarum is a species of air-breathing land snail, a terrestrial pulmonate gastropod mollusk in the family Sphincterochilidae.

Distribution 
The species occurs in Egypt (northeastern Egypt and Sinai Peninsula), southern Israel, Jordan, and in the coastal mountains of western Saudi Arabia.

Shell description 
The shell is perforate, depressed, solid, stridulate, cretaceous, white and with suture impressed. The shell has 4½ flattened or slightly convex whorls. The last whorl is very obsoletely angulated, rounded in front, shortly and
suddenly deflected.

The width of the shell is 16 mm.

References 
This article incorporates public domain text from reference.

Further reading 
 Alona G., Shoreb L.S. & Steinberger Y. (2007). "Correlation between levels of sex hormones (progesterone, testosterone, and estrogen) and ecophysiological-behavior stages in two species of desert snails (Sphincterochila zonata and Sphincterochila prophetarum) in the Northern Negev Desert". General and Comparative Endocrinology 151(1): 122–127.

External links 
 George Washington Tryon, Jr. 1887. Manual of Conchology. Second series: Pulmonata. Volume 3. Helicidae - Volume I. Plate 2, figure 49-50..

Sphincterochilidae
Gastropods described in 1852